This is a list of franchise records for the Edmonton Oilers of the National Hockey League.

All-time regular season leaders

Skaters
Current to the 2021–22 NHL season.
*Included 43 WHA goals

*Included 61 WHA assists

*Included 104 WHA points

*Included 298 WHA PIM*Included 34 WHA EV goals

*Included 9 WHA PP goals

*Included 7 WHA GW goals

^4-on-4 overtime
^^Four 4-on-4 overtime goals and one 3-on-3 overtime goal
*3-on-3 overtime

^4-on-4 overtime
*3-on-3 overtime

Defencemen
*Included 53 WHA goals

*Included 258 WHA assists

*Included 311 WHA points*Included 31 WHA goals

*Included 21 WHA PP goals^4-on-4 overtime
^^Included WHA OT goals
**Included one 4-on-4 overtime*3-on-3 overtime''

Goaltenders
*Included 94 WHA wins
^Included 6 shootout wins

*Included 87 WHA losses
^Included 12 overtime losses
**Included 9 overtime losses

*Included 632 WHA goals against

Coaches
*Included 178 WHA games

*Included 95 WHA wins
^Included 31 shootout wins
**Included 13 shootout wins
^^Included 5 shootout wins
***Included 2 shootout wins*Included 76 WHA losses
^Included 36 overtime losses
**Included 15 overtime losses
^^Included 2 overtime losses

Single season records

Team
*Included 5 shootout wins

Skaters

Defencemen

Goaltenders
*Included 4 shootout wins

*Included 4 shootout wins
^Included 2 shootout wins

*Included 4 overtime losses
^Included 3 overtime losses
**Included 1 overtime loss

*Included 1 overtime loss
^Included 2 overtime losses

All-time post-season leaders

Skaters
*Included 10 WHA goals

*Included 10 WHA assists

*Included 20 WHA points*Included 42 WHA PIM
^Included 37 WHA PIM*Included 1 WHA GW

Defencemen

Goaltenders

Coaches

Single season playoff records

Team

Skaters

Defensemen

Goaltenders

Single game records

Team

Player

Miscellaneous
October 1984 became the first calendar month in Oilers history where the team did not record a single loss.
January 2010 became the first calendar month in Oilers history where the team did not record a single win.
Longest consecutive goal streak:
Dave Lumley, 12 (15 goals, 13 assists; November 21 - December 16, 1981).
Wayne Gretzky, 12 (16 goals, 18 assists; March 26 - October 20, 1983).
Longest consecutive goal streak, rookie: Jari Kurri, 6 (7 goals, 4 assists; March 21 - April 1, 1981).
Longest consecutive goal streak, from start of season: Wayne Gretzky, 8 (11 goals, 10 assists; October 5 - 20, 1983).
Longest winning streak:
Andy Moog, 10 (March 11 - October 19, 1983).
Grant Fuhr, 10 (February 14 - March 25, 1986).
Longest home winning streak: Andy Moog, 13 (February 4 - November 18, 1983).
Longest road winning streak:
Andy Moog, 7 (December 14, 1983 - January 25, 1984).
Devan Dubnyk, 7 (February 21 - April 1, 2012).
Most assists before scoring the first goal of the season: Ryan Whitney, 24 (2010–11).
Most assists before scoring the first goal of the season by a forward: Ryan Nugent-Hopkins, 17 (2021–22).
Most hat-tricks, career: Wayne Gretzky, 55.
Most four goals or more in a game: Wayne Gretzky, 15.
Most five goals or more in a game: Wayne Gretzky, 4.

See also
List of Edmonton Oilers players
List of NHL statistical leaders
50 goals in 50 games
List of NHL players

References

Records
National Hockey League statistical records
records